Santa Maria Domenica Mazzarello is a parish church of the Diocese of Rome as well as a titular church to which a cardinal priest is sometimes assigned.

Church 

The Chiesa di Santa Maria Domenica Mazzarello is dedicated to Saint Maria Domenica Mazzarello (1837–1881), Italian founder of the Salesian Sisters.

It was built in 1997 as a parish church in the Roman Catholic Diocese of Rome and seats 300. Its address is Piazza Salvatore Galgano 100, Roma, Lazio 00173, at the Viale Bruno Pelizze, in East Rome's XXth prefecture.

Pope John Paul II visited the church on 14 December 1997.

The church was established as a titular church on 21 February 2001.

Cardinal-protectors 
 Venezuelan Cardinal Ignacio Antonio Velasco García, S.D.B. (February 21, 2001 – July 6, 2003)
 Australian Cardinal George Pell (October 21, 2003 – January 10, 2023) had been the Cardinal-Priest since 2004

References

Sources and external links
 GCatholic the cardinal title
 GCatholic the church
 Parochial website (in Italian)

Maria Domenica Mazzarello
Maria Domenica Mazzarello
Rome Q. XXIV Don Bosco